Coșnița is a commune located in Dubăsari District of the Republic of Moldova, on the eastern bank of the River Dniester. It consists  of two villages, Coșnița and Pohrebea (Pogrebya).

During the 1992 War of Transnistria, the commune was the center of some of the heaviest fighting between the local inhabitants and the government of the Republic of Moldova on one side, and the secessionist government of Transnistria and the Russian 14th Army, on the other.
As a legacy of that war, Pogrebea today hosts one of the largest areas of unremoved landmines in the region.

Population 
According to the 2004 Moldovan Census, the commune had a population of 5,699 people, of which Coșnița 4,996, and Pohrebea 703. Of these, 5,524 (4,829 in Coșnița, and 695 in Pohrebea) were ethnic Moldavians, 167 (160 in Coșnița, and 7 in Pohrebea) were ethnic minorities, and 9 other/undeclared.

Etymology

In Romanian language, Pogrebă means "a basement", and -ea is a specific ending in Romanian; the addition of which means that Pogrebea signifies "the basement", while Coșnița is derived from the Bulgarian word for "basket" - "кошница"/"koshnitsa".

Notable people
 Petru Soltan (1931-2016), Moldavian mathematician
 Yosef Baratz (1890-1968), Zionist activist and Israeli politician

See also
 War of Transnistria
 Joint Control Commission

References

Communes of Dubăsari District
Populated places on the Dniester
Tiraspolsky Uyezd